Els Callens and Meilen Tu were the defending champions but they competed with different partners that year. Callens partnered with Shinobu Asagoe, and lost in the first round to Eleni Daniilidou and Katarina Srebotnik. Tu partnered with Tina Križan, and lost in the quarterfinals to Maria Kirilenko and Maria Sharapova.

Kirilenko and Sharapova won the title, defeating Lisa McShea and Milagros Sequera in the final 6–2, 6–1. Despite playing on the WTA tour for a further 16 years, this was Sharapova's last WTA final, and title, in doubles.

Seeds
Champion seeds are indicated in bold text while text in italics indicates the round in which those seeds were eliminated.

  María Vento-Kabchi /  Angelique Widjaja (first round)
  Li Ting /  Sun Tiantian (first round)
  Alicia Molik /  Magüi Serna (quarterfinals)
  Liezel Huber /  Tatiana Perebiynis (first round)

Draw

Main draw

Qualifying draw

References
 2004 DFS Classic Draws
 ITF Tournament Page
 ITF doubles results page
 ITF doubles qualifying results page

DFS Classic - Doubles
Doubles